Liam Patrick Hardy (born 1973) is an American lawyer who serves as a judge of the United States Court of Appeals for the Armed Forces.

Education 

Hardy earned a Bachelor of Science in Engineering, magna cum laude, in May 1995 from Princeton University majoring in mechanical and aerospace engineering, a Master of Science in aeronautics and astronautics in June 1996 from Stanford University, and a Juris Doctor, cum laude, in May 2008 from Georgetown University Law Center, where he served as the Senior Administrative Editor of The Georgetown Law Journal.

Legal career 

Upon graduation from law school, Hardy served as a law clerk to Judge Margaret A. Ryan of the United States Court of Appeals for the Armed Forces. He later served as a law clerk to Chief Judge David B. Sentelle of the United States Court of Appeals for the District of Columbia, and to Justice Clarence Thomas of the Supreme Court of the United States. Prior to joining the United States Department of Justice, he was a litigation partner in the Washington, D.C. office of Kirkland & Ellis. Hardy was a Deputy Assistant Attorney General for the Office of Legal Counsel. He also serves as a lecturer on law at Harvard Law School, and as an adjunct professor at Notre Dame Law School.

Court of Appeals service 
On May 6, 2020, President Trump announced his intent to nominate Hardy to serve as a Judge of the United States Court of Appeals for the Armed Forces. On May 21, 2020, his nomination was sent to the Senate. President Trump nominated Hardy to the seat being vacated by Judge Margaret A. Ryan, whose term expired on July 31, 2020. On August 4, 2020, he received a hearing before the Senate Armed Services Committee. On September 15, 2020, his nomination was reported out of committee by a voice vote. On December 3, 2020, the United States Senate invoked cloture on his nomination by a 61–34 vote. His nomination was confirmed later that day by a 59–34 vote. He was sworn in on December 8, 2020.

See also 
 List of law clerks of the Supreme Court of the United States (Seat 10)

References

External links 
 

1973 births
Living people
Place of birth missing (living people)
Princeton University School of Engineering and Applied Science alumni
Stanford University School of Engineering alumni
American aerospace engineers
Georgetown University Law Center alumni
21st-century American lawyers
Law clerks of the Supreme Court of the United States
People associated with Kirkland & Ellis
United States Department of Justice lawyers
Harvard Law School faculty
Notre Dame Law School faculty
United States Article I federal judges appointed by Donald Trump
Judges of the United States Court of Appeals for the Armed Forces
21st-century American judges